WIIN (780 AM) is a radio station licensed to serve Ridgeland, Mississippi.  The station is owned by The Radio People and licensed to New South Radio, Inc.  The station's studios are in Ridgeland, with a transmitter located west of the city along the Natchez Trace Parkway.

History
The station was assigned the WIIN call letters by the Federal Communications Commission on July 31, 1995.

This station has had many formats over its history.   Some of these included:  classical, easy listening, inspirational talk, talk shows hosted by African-American hosts and appealing to African-American audiences, all-news, blues, golden oldies pop, all-Spanish speaking, big band, talk shows hosted by female hosts appealing to female audiences, and Southern-gospel.

Until 2009, the station had been affiliated with God's Country Radio Network.

In recent years, the station has been "on and off" the air at sporadic intervals.  In June 2009, WIIN was shut down.  By May 2010, however, WIIN had returned to the air as a simulcast of WYOY.  On July 14, 2010, the station once again went dark. On June 22, 2011 WIIN returned to the air simulcasting country-formatted WUSJ 96.3 FM.

In November 2012, the station played all-Christmas music and simulcast with translator W226BS 93.1 FM in Cedar Hills/Jackson.   On January 6 and 7, 2013, the station began the day with Christmas music and all-Beatles music.   Since January 7, 2013, the station started playing all-Beatles music.

On June 16, 2016 WIIN changed their format to sports after that format moved from WSFZ 930 AM Jackson, MS, which went silent.

On October 10, 2016 WIIN changed their format from sports to a simulcast of classic country-formatted WJXN-FM 100.9 FM, branded as "100.9 The Legend".

On July 31, 2017 WIIN switched its simulcast from WJXN-FM 100.9 Utica to WHJT 93.5 FM Kearney Park.

In late December 2017 WIIN dropped its simulcast with WHJT and launched a blues format, branded as "Blues 93.1".

On July 14, 2021, WIIN changed their format from blues (which continues on W225BK, now fed via WHJT-HD2) to rhythmic oldies, branded as "102.1 The Box".

Translators
In addition to the main station, WIIN is relayed by an FM translator to widen its broadcast area. The FM translators are allowed to broadcast 24 hours a day, unlike the main WIIN signal.

Previous logo

References

External links
WIIN official website

IIN
IIN
Blues radio stations
Rhythmic oldies radio stations in the United States